Viticoideae is one of seven subfamilies in the sage family, Lamiaceae.

Genera
This subfamily contains the following 10 genera:
 Cornutia L.
 Gmelina L.
 Paravitex Fletcher
 Petitia Jacq.
 Pseudocarpidium Millsp.
 Premna L.
 Teijsmanniodendron Koorders
 Tsoongia Merrill
 Viticipremna H.J.Lam
 Vitex L.

References

External links

Lamiaceae
Asterid subfamilies